Kłosiński is a Polish language habitational surname for someone  from Kłuśno. Notable people with the name include:
 Edward Kłosiński (1943–2008), Polish cinematographer
 Janusz Kłosiński (1920–2017), Polish film and theatre actor
 Sebastian Kłosiński (1992), Polish speed skater

References 

Polish-language surnames
Polish toponymic surnames